Edward Mills "Eddie" Machen (June 15, 1932 – August 8, 1972) was an American professional boxer. He was one of 6 children of a rural mail carrier. Machen dropped out of high school and became an amateur boxer. However, after just 3 bouts he was arrested and convicted of armed robbery. After his release, he became a professional boxer, determined never to return to prison again. His 64-bout career began on March 22, 1955, and he went on to win his first 24 bouts. He was highly rated and fought most of the big names of his era.

Professional career

Early career
Machen often fought at Civic Auditorium or the Cow Palace in San Francisco. His first bout was with fellow first-timer Raul Flores, whom he knocked out in the first round. He had eleven fights in 1955 and the six-foot, 195-pounder won them all, ten by knockout or technical knockout. He had eight more wins in 1956 against better competition. In 1957, he won all five fights he had, including two over former light heavyweight champion Joey Maxim. The Maxim wins made him a ranked contender.

In April 1958, he met highly ranked Zora Folley and fought to a draw over 12 rounds. But he was then knocked out in one round by undefeated future heavyweight champion Ingemar Johansson, in September. After being caught flush by a big right hand Machen was floored three times, the last for some minutes.

On the comeback trail in 1959, Machen posted seven straight wins to return him to contention. In January 1960, he lost a decision to Folley at the Cow Palace. Later that year he met top contender and future champion, Sonny Liston, and although he lost by a clear 12-round unanimous decision, fought a sharp hit and move match that many believed was later studied by heavyweight champion Muhammad Ali. Liston was penalized three times for low blows in that match.

1961 began with two wins, then a very controversial loss to Harold Johnson by decision.  Again, he came back with three very good wins, including a decision over undefeated Doug Jones. In 1962, Machen had two more wins before he had a draw with high-ranked big hitter Cleveland Williams in Houston in July 1962.  In 1963 he resumed fighting and scored four straight knockouts to finish the year. He fought just twice in 1964, battling his personal issues. One was a win, the other a close 12-round loss to another former heavyweight champion, Floyd Patterson in Sweden in July 1964.

Title shot and late career
In 1965, Machen  received his first world title shot when he and 6' 6" Ernie Terrell met for the vacated World Boxing Association title that had been stripped from Muhammad Ali.  Terrell won the 15-round decision. In 1966 he lost a decision to German southpaw Karl Mildenberger in Germany, then lost a close split-decision to powerful slugger Manuel Ramos. But he closed that year with two wins, one particularly notable over future contender Jerry Quarry, which was Quarry's first defeat

Versus Joe Frazier
In late 1966, Machen fought young future heavyweight champion Joe Frazier and lost in a tenth-round technical knockout. Downed in the first round, Machen continued to try to out-slug rather than out-box the relentless Frazier.

Retirement
Machen retired in 1967 at age 35 following consecutive losses to Henry Clark, Boone Kirkman and Joe Frazier.

Health and death
Machen was admitted to the Napa State Hospital in the fall of 1962 after threatening to commit suicide. Biographies state he suffered from clinical depression. He later filed for bankruptcy in 1966 and retired from boxing in 1967. His final record was 50-11-3, with 27 KOs.

Eddie Machen was found dead in San Francisco on August 8, 1972, apparently the result of a fall from a second story apartment window. He was 40 years old. It is not known if the cause of death was suicide, accident, or murder.

Professional boxing record

|-
|align="center" colspan=8|50 Wins (29 knockouts, 21 decisions), 11 Losses (3 knockouts, 8 decisions), 3 Draws 
|-
| align="center" style="border-style: none none solid solid; background: #e3e3e3"|Result
| align="center" style="border-style: none none solid solid; background: #e3e3e3"|Record
| align="center" style="border-style: none none solid solid; background: #e3e3e3"|Opponent
| align="center" style="border-style: none none solid solid; background: #e3e3e3"|Type
| align="center" style="border-style: none none solid solid; background: #e3e3e3"|Round
| align="center" style="border-style: none none solid solid; background: #e3e3e3"|Date
| align="center" style="border-style: none none solid solid; background: #e3e3e3"|Location
| align="center" style="border-style: none none solid solid; background: #e3e3e3"|Notes
|-align=center
|Loss
|50–11–3
|align=left| Boone Kirkman
|TKO
|3
|26/05/1967
|align=left| Seattle Center Coliseum, Seattle, Washington
|align=left|
|-
|Loss
|50–10–3
|align=left| Henry Clark
|PTS
|12
|28/03/1967
|align=left| Sacramento Memorial Auditorium, Sacramento, California
|align=left|
|-
|Loss
|50–9–3
|align=left| Joe Frazier
|TKO
|10
|21/11/1966
|align=left| Olympic Auditorium, Los Angeles, California
|align=left|
|-
|Win
|50–8–3
|align=left| George "Scrap Iron" Johnson
|UD
|10
|29/09/1966
|align=left| Olympic Auditorium, Los Angeles, California
|align=left|
|-
|Win
|49–8–3
|align=left| Jerry Quarry
|UD
|10
|14/07/1966
|align=left| Olympic Auditorium, Los Angeles, California
|align=left|
|-
|Win
|48–8–3
|align=left| Joey Orbillo
|SD
|10
|23/06/1966
|align=left| Olympic Auditorium, Los Angeles, California
|align=left|
|-
|Loss
|47–8–3
|align=left| Manuel "Pulgarcito" Ramos
|SD
|10
|03/06/1966
|align=left| Los Angeles Sports Arena, Los Angeles, California
|align=left|
|-
|Loss
|47—7—3
|align=left| Karl Mildenberger
|PTS
|10
|03/02/1966
|align=left| Festhalle Frankfurt, Frankfurt, Hesse
|align=left|
|-
| Draw
|47-6-3
|align=left| Elmer Rush
|PTS
|10
|10/05/1965
|align=left| San Francisco Civic Auditorium, San Francisco, California
|align=left|
|-
|Loss
|47–6–2
|align=left| Ernie Terrell
|UD
|15
|05/03/1965
|align=left| International Amphitheatre, Chicago, Illinois
|align=left|
|-
|Loss
|47–5–2
|align=left| Floyd Patterson
|PTS
|12
|05/07/1964
|align=left| Rasunda, Solna Municipality
|align=left|
|-
|Win
|47–4–2
|align=left| Duke Sabedong
|KO
|1
|17/02/1964
|align=left| Kezar Pavilion, San Francisco, California
|align=left|
|-
|Win
|46–4–2
|align=left| Dave E. Bailey
|KO
|8
|30/11/1963
|align=left| Reno, Nevada
|align=left|
|-
|Win
|45–4–2
|align=left| Bill McMurray
|KO
|7
|05/11/1963
|align=left| Sacramento Memorial Auditorium, Sacramento, California
|align=left|
|-
|Win
|44–4–2
|align=left| Alonzo Johnson
|KO
|9
|12/10/1963
|align=left| Santa Monica Civic Auditorium, Santa Monica, California
|align=left|
|-
|Win
|43–4–2
|align=left| Ollie Wilson
|KO
|6
|16/09/1963
|align=left| Santa Monica Civic Auditorium, Santa Monica, California
|align=left|
|-
| Draw
|42-4-2
|align=left| Cleveland Williams
|PTS
|10
|10/07/1962
|align=left| Sam Houston Coliseum, Houston, Texas
|align=left|
|-
|Win
|42–4–1
|align=left| Roger Rischer
|UD
|10
|28/05/1962
|align=left| San Francisco Civic Auditorium, San Francisco, California
|align=left|
|-
|Win
|41–4—1
|align=left| Bert Whitehurst
|TKO
|6
|23/04/1962
|align=left| Los Angeles Sports Arena, Los Angeles, California
|align=left|
|-
|Win
|40–4–1
|align=left| Doug Jones
|UD
|10
|02/12/1961
|align=left| Miami Beach Convention Center, Miami Beach, Florida
|align=left|
|-
|Win
|39–4–1
|align=left| Brian London
|RTD
|5
|17/10/1961
|align=left| Empire Pool, Wembley, London
|align=left|
|-
|Win
|38–4–1
|align=left| Mike DeJohn
|TKO
|9
|16/09/1961
|align=left| Syracuse War Memorial Arena, Syracuse, New York
|align=left|
|-
|Loss
|37–4–1
|align=left| Harold Johnson
|PTS
|10
|01/07/1961
|align=left| Boardwalk Hall, Atlantic City, New Jersey
|align=left|
|-
|Win
|37–3–1
|align=left| Mike DeJohn
|UD
|10
|10/04/1961
|align=left| Cow Palace, Daly City, California
|align=left|
|-
|Win
|36–3–1
|align=left| Garvin Sawyer
|KO
|5
|22/02/1961
|align=left| Stockton, California
|align=left|
|-
|Win
|35–3–1
|align=left| Wayne Bethea
|UD
|10
|19/12/1960
|align=left| Auditorium, Portland, Oregon
|align=left|
|-
|Loss
|34-3–1
|align=left| Sonny Liston
|UD
|12
|07/09/1960
|align=left| Sick's Stadium, Seattle, Washington
|align=left|
|-
|Win
|34–2–1
|align=left| Alonzo Johnson
|UD
|10
|08/06/1960
|align=left| Chicago Stadium, Chicago, Illinois
|align=left|
|-
|Win
|33–2–1
|align=left| Alex Miteff
|UD
|10
|20/05/1960
|align=left| Madison Square Garden, New York City
|align=left|
|-
|Win
|32–2–1
|align=left| Billy H. Hunter
|TKO
|9
|26/02/1960
|align=left| Madison Square Garden, New York City
|align=left|
|-
|Loss
|31–2–1
|align=left| Zora Folley
|UD
|12
|18/01/1960
|align=left| Cow Palace, Daly City, California
|align=left|
|-
|Win
|31–1–1
|align=left| Pat McMurtry
|KO
|1
|27/10/1959
|align=left| Pacific Livestock Pavilion, Portland, Oregon
|align=left|
|-
|Win
|30–1–1
|align=left| Willi Besmanoff
|UD
|10
|16/09/1959
|align=left| Auditorium, Portland, Oregon
|align=left|
|-
|Win
|29–1–1
|align=left| Garvin Sawyer
|PTS
|10
|11/08/1959
|align=left| Memorial Auditorium, Fresno, California
|align=left|
|-
|Win
|28–1–1
|align=left| Reuben Vargas
|TKO
|6
|22/07/1959
|align=left| Portland Metropolitan Exposition Center, Portland, Oregon
|align=left|
|-
|Win
|27–1–1
|align=left| Reuben Vargas
|UD
|10
|20/05/1959
|align=left| Cow Palace, Daly City, California
|align=left|
|-
|Win
|26–1–1
|align=left| Clarence Williams
|TKO
|9
|31/03/1959
|align=left| Sacramento Memorial Auditorium, Sacramento, California
|align=left|
|-
|Win
|25–1–1
|align=left| Young Jack Johnson
|UD
|10
|05/03/1959
|align=left| Auditorium, Portland, Oregon
|align=left|
|-
|Loss
|24–1–1
|align=left| Ingemar Johansson
|KO
|1
|14/09/1958
|align=left| Nya Ullevi, Gothenburg
|align=left|
|-
| Draw
|24–0–1
|align=left| Zora Folley
|PTS
|12
|09/04/1958
|align=left| Cow Palace, Daly City, California
|align=left|
|-
|Win
|24–0
|align=left| Tommy Hurricane Jackson
|RTD
|10
|13/11/1957
|align=left| Cow Palace, Daly City, California
|align=left|
|-
|Win
|23–0
|align=left| Edgardo Romero
|KO
|5
|18/09/1957
|align=left| Auditorium, Portland, Oregon
|align=left|
|-
|Win
|22–0
|align=left| Bob Baker
|UD
|10
|24/07/1957
|align=left| Chicago Stadium, Chicago, Illinois
|align=left|
|-
|Win
|21–0
|align=left| Joey Maxim
|UD
|10
|03/05/1957
|align=left| Kentucky Exposition Center, Louisville, Kentucky
|align=left|
|-
|Win
|20–0
|align=left| Joey Maxim
|UD
|10
|25/01/1957
|align=left| Miami Beach Auditorium, Miami Beach, Florida
|align=left|
|-
|Win
|19–0
|align=left| Johnny Summerlin
|UD
|10
|05/12/1956
|align=left| Syracuse War Memorial Arena, Syracuse, New York
|align=left|
|-
|Win
|18–0
|align=left| John Holman
|KO
|7
|24/10/1956
|align=left| Portland Armory, Portland, Oregon
|align=left|
|-
|Win
|17–0
|align=left| Julio Mederos
|UD
|10
|04/09/1956
|align=left| Auditorium, Portland, Oregon
|align=left|
|-
|Win
|16–0
|align=left| Walter Hafer
|TKO
|4
|16/08/1956
|align=left| Auditorium, Portland, Oregon
|align=left|
|-
|Win
|15–0
|align=left| Nino Valdes
|KO
|8
|11/07/1956
|align=left| Miami Beach Auditorium, Miami Beach, Florida
|align=left|
|-
|Win
|14–0
|align=left| Matt Jackson
|TKO
|4
|18/06/1956
|align=left| San Francisco Botanical Garden, San Francisco, California
|align=left|
|-
|Win
|13–0
|align=left| Nino Valdes
|UD
|10
|16/04/1956
|align=left| Cow Palace, Daly City, California
|align=left|
|-
|Win
|12–0
|align=left| Julio Mederos
|UD
|10
|22/02/1956
|align=left| San Francisco Botanical Garden, San Francisco, California
|align=left|
|-
|Win
|11–0
|align=left| Ben Wise
|UD
|10
|12/12/1955
|align=left| San Francisco, San Francisco, California
|align=left|
|-
|Win
|10–0
|align=left| Max Chris
|KO
|1
|22/11/1955
|align=left| Auditorium, Richmond, California
|align=left|
|-
|Win
|9–0
|align=left| Howard "Honeyboy" King
|TKO
|10
|27/09/1955
|align=left| Auditorium, Richmond, California
|align=left|
|-
|Win
|8–0
|align=left| Bill Davis
|KO
|1
|13/09/1955
|align=left| Auditorium, Richmond, California
|align=left|
|-
|Win
|7–0
|align=left| Frank Buford
|TKO
|8
|26/08/1955
|align=left| Cow Palace, Daly City, California
|align=left|
|-
|Win
|6–0
|align=left| Shamus Jones
|KO
|2
|08/08/1955
|align=left| San Francisco, California
|align=left|
|-
|Win
|5–0
|align=left| Artie Lucido
|KO
|1
|22/06/1955
|align=left| Polo Grounds, New York City
|align=left|
|-
|Win
|4–0
|align=left| Clarence Williams
|KO
|3
|14/05/1955
|align=left| Redding, California
|align=left|
|-
|Win
|3–0
|align=left| George Kennedy
|KO
|1
|13/04/1955
|align=left| Cow Palace, Daly City, California
|align=left|
|-
|Win
|2–0
|align=left|Ed Robertson
|TKO
|1
|29/03/1955
|align=left| Auditorium, Richmond, California
|align=left|
|-
|Win
|1–0
|align=left| Raul Flores
|KO
|1
|22/03/1955
|align=left| Sacramento, California
|align=left|

References

External links
 

1932 births
1972 deaths
People from Redding, California
Boxers from California
Heavyweight boxers
American male boxers